Dorneck District is one of the ten districts of the canton of Solothurn in Switzerland, situated to the north of the canton. Together with Thierstein District, it forms the Amtei (electoral district) of Dorneck-Thierstein. Five of the district's eleven municipalities are exclaves, either within the canton of Basel-Country or bordering France.

Municipalities
Dorneck District contains the following municipalities:

Mergers and name changes
On 1 January 1986 the municipality of Hofstetten (SO) changed its name to Hofstetten-Flüh.

Geography
Of this area,  or 44.2% is used for agricultural purposes, while  or 44.1% is forested.

Of the built up area, housing and buildings made up 7.1% and transportation infrastructure made up 2.9%.  Out of the forested land, 41.7% of the total land area is heavily forested and 2.3% is covered with orchards or small clusters of trees.  Of the agricultural land, 37.8% is used for growing crops, while 6.0% is used for orchards or vine crops.  All the water in the district is flowing water.

Coat of arms

The blazon of the municipal coat of arms is Argent two Fish-hooks inverted and addorsed Sable.

Demographics
Dorneck has a population of 

Most of the population speaks German (16,601 or 92.3%), with Italian being second most common (245 or 1.4%) and French being third (234 or 1.3%).  There are 9 people who speak Romansh.

, the gender distribution of the population was 48.7% male and 51.3% female.  The population was made up of 7,911 Swiss men (40.5% of the population) and 1,603 (8.2%) non-Swiss men.  There were 8,446 Swiss women (43.3%) and 1,568 (8.0%) non-Swiss women.  Of the population in the district 4,863 or about 27.0% were born in Dorneck and lived there in 2000.  There were 1,178 or 6.6% who were born in the same canton, while 8,211 or 45.7% were born somewhere else in Switzerland, and 3,171 or 17.6% were born outside of Switzerland.

In  there were 138 live births to Swiss citizens and 22 births to non-Swiss citizens, and in same time span there were 102 deaths of Swiss citizens and 7 non-Swiss citizen deaths.  Ignoring immigration and emigration, the population of Swiss citizens increased by 36 while the foreign population increased by 15.  There were 5 Swiss men who immigrated back to Switzerland and 15 Swiss women who emigrated from Switzerland.  At the same time, there were 73 non-Swiss men and 29 non-Swiss women who immigrated from another country to Switzerland.  The total Swiss population change in 2008 (from all sources, including moves across municipal borders) was an increase of 21 and the non-Swiss population increased by 99 people.  This represents a population growth rate of 0.6%.

, there were 7,349 people who were single and never married in the district.  There were 8,940 married individuals, 801 widows or widowers and 888 individuals who are divorced.

There were 2,056 households that consist of only one person and 538 households with five or more people.  Out of a total of 7,429 households that answered this question, 27.7% were households made up of just one person and 47 were adults who lived with their parents.  Of the rest of the households,  there are 2,251 married couples without children, 2,412 married couples with children  There were 394 single parents with a child or children.  There were 105 households that were made up unrelated people and 164 households that were made some sort of institution or another collective housing.

The historical population is given in the following chart:

Politics
In the 2007 federal election the most popular party was the SVP which received 24.07% of the vote.  The next three most popular parties were the SP (21.61%), the CVP (18.43%) and the FDP (17.18%).  In the federal election, a total of 6,941 votes were cast, and the voter turnout was 52.9%.

Religion
Of the rest of the population, there were 103 members of an Orthodox church (or about 0.57% of the population), there were 65 individuals (or about 0.36% of the population) who belonged to the Christian Catholic Church, and there were 654 individuals (or about 3.64% of the population) who belonged to another Christian church. There were 4 individuals (or about 0.02% of the population) who were Jewish, and 276 (or about 1.54% of the population) who were Islamic. There were 37 individuals who were Buddhist, 73 individuals who were Hindu and 21 individuals who belonged to another church.  3,968 (or about 22.07% of the population) belonged to no church, are agnostic or atheist, and 623 individuals (or about 3.47% of the population) did not answer the question.

Education
In Dorneck about 7,098 or (39.5%) of the population have completed non-mandatory upper secondary education, and 3,166 or (17.6%) have completed additional higher education (either University or a Fachhochschule).  Of the 3,166 who completed tertiary schooling, 55.7% were Swiss men, 24.4% were Swiss women, 10.7% were non-Swiss men and 9.3% were non-Swiss women.

References

Districts of the canton of Solothurn